General Walker may refer to:

United Kingdom
Antony Walker (born 1934), British Army general
Charles Pyndar Beauchamp Walker (1817–1894), British Army general
Sir George Walker, 1st Baronet (1764–1842), British Army general
Harold Walker (British Army officer) (1862–1934), British Army lieutenant general
Henry Alexander Walker (1874–1953), British Army honorary brigadier general
Mark Walker (British Army officer) (1827–1902), British Army general
Michael Walker, Baron Walker of Aldringham (born 1944), British Army general
Roland Walker (born 1970), British Army lieutenant-general
Walter Walker (British Army officer) (1912–2001), British Army general
William George Walker (1863–1936), British Army major general

United States
Edwin Walker (1909–1993), U.S. Army general, only general to resign in the 20th century
Emmett H. Walker Jr. (1924–2007), U.S. Army lieutenant general
Flem Walker (fl. 1980s–2020s), U.S. Army lieutenant general
Francis Amasa Walker (1840–1897), honorary brigadier general following service in the Union Army
Fred L. Walker (1887–1969), U.S. Army major general
George J. Walker (1934–2005), U.S. Army brigadier general
Glenn D. Walker (1916–2002), U.S. Army lieutenant general
John T. Walker (USMC) (1893–1955), U.S. Marine Corps lieutenant general
Kenneth Walker (1898–1943), U.S. Army Air Forces brigadier general
Meriwether Lewis Walker (1869–1947), U.S. Army brigadier general
Sam S. Walker (1925–2015), U.S. Army general
Walton Walker (1889–1950), general commanding the U.S. Army in Korea at the start of the Korean War
William J. Walker (fl. 1970s–2020s), U.S. Army major general

Confederate States Army
Francis Marion Walker (1827–1864), brigadier general
Henry Harrison Walker (1832–1912), brigadier general
James A. Walker (1832–1901), brigadier general
John George Walker (1821–1893), major general
LeRoy Pope Walker (1817–1884), brigadier general
Lucius M. Walker (1829–1863), brigadier general
Reuben Lindsay Walker (1827–1890), brigadier general
William H. T. Walker (1816–1864), major general
William Stephen Walker (1822–1899), brigadier general

See also
Attorney General Walker (disambiguation)
Admiral Walker (disambiguation)